The 2020 presidential campaign of Jo Jorgensen was formally launched on November 2, 2019, at the South Carolina Libertarian Party convention. Jorgensen had previously been the Libertarian Party's vice presidential nominee in 1996, when she ran on a ticket with author Harry Browne. Currently a senior lecturer of psychology at Clemson University, Jorgensen had owned a software company at the time of her 1996 vice presidential candidacy.

Jorgensen's positions are typically described as being consistent with the Libertarian Party's platform. Her campaign has received less media coverage than those of Gary Johnson, former Republican governor of New Mexico and Jorgensen's predecessor as the Libertarian Party's presidential nominee in 2012 and 2016. Her name recognition upon entering the race is also widely considered to have been lower than Johnson's. Although Jorgensen is often described as appealing to the Libertarian Party's base, some in the party, such as her main primary opponent Future of Freedom Foundation founder Jacob Hornberger, have criticized her for perceived departures from libertarian ideology in exchange for mainstream appeal.

The Libertarian Party experienced a competitive primary. On May 23, at the virtual 2020 Libertarian National Convention, Jorgensen was selected as the party's 2020 presidential nominee after four rounds of voting by delegates. She is the party's first female presidential nominee. Podcaster Spike Cohen—Vermin Supreme's original running mate—was selected to be Jorgensen's running mate the next day, despite Jorgensen having expressed a preference for fellow presidential candidate John Monds.

Background 
In 1996, Jorgensen was nominated by the Libertarian Party as its candidate for vice president in the 1996 election. The party's presidential nominee was free market writer and investment analyst Harry Browne. The Browne/Jorgensen ticket received 485,798 votes (0.5% of the popular vote) in the general election, which was won by incumbent president Bill Clinton. Jorgensen had previously run for South Carolina's 4th congressional district in 1992, receiving 4,286 votes (2.2% of the popular vote).

Platform

Primary campaign 

In the Libertarian primaries, Jorgensen placed second in terms of overall votes cast, behind Future of Freedom Foundation founder Jacob Hornberger. Jorgensen won a single primary prior to the Convention, in Nebraska, on May 12, 2020. After Justin Amash entered and then exited the race Jacob Hornberger lost a significant number of votes and on the fourth round of balloting Jorgensen was nominated. She did not endorse anybody to be her running mate and after three ballots Spike Cohen was nominated. After her nomination, she went on to win the New Mexico primary on June 2, 2020, which had been postponed due to the COVID-19 pandemic.

General election campaign

Ballot access 
Jorgensen achieved ballot access in all 50 states and the District of Columbia on September 15, 2020.

Website crash 
After the first presidential debate between Donald Trump and Joe Biden, Jorgensen's website crashed due to high volume of traffic.

Campaign finance 
Jorgensen raised $3,442,156 on her presidential campaign, loaning $9,784 of her own money to her campaign and raising $3,415,793 from individual contributions. She spent $3,420,928 and has $106,132 in outstanding debts with $21,228 of ending cash in hand.

Results 

Jo Jorgensen received 1,865,535 total votes and 1.2% of the national vote, coming third in the nation. She achieved the Libertarian Party's second strongest historical result to date behind Gary Johnson's 2016 presidential campaign. The highest percentage of votes received by Jorgensen was in South Dakota, where she received 2.63% or 11,095 votes.

Endorsements 

Jorgensen has received endorsements from Kennedy, Peter Schiff, John Stossel, and Katherine Timpf, among others. She has also received endorsements from many former Libertarian candidates in the 2020 race, including Jacob Hornberger, Justin Amash, Adam Kokesh and Vermin Supreme. In addition, she received an endorsement from 2012 and 2016 Libertarian nominee Gary Johnson.

References

External links 
 
 

Jorgensen
2020 in women's history